Shirley Dorismond is a Canadian politician and former union leader and nurse, who represents the electoral district of Marie-Victorin in the National Assembly of Quebec. She is a member of the Coalition Avenir Québec (CAQ), winning a 2022 by-election following the resignation of the former MNA Catherine Fournier. She is the first CAQ MNA for Marie-Victorin, as the district had been a Parti Québécois (PQ) stronghold since its creation in 1980, with only a one-year gap in 1984 when the Liberal party won a byelection, until Fournier left the PQ in 2019.

She previously worked as a nurse, and served as the vice-president of the Fédération interprofessionnelle de la santé du Québec (FIQ), a union representing nearly 75,000 nurses, nursing assistants, respiratory therapists and clinical perfusionists working in health establishments across Quebec.

Election results

References 

Coalition Avenir Québec MNAs
Women MNAs in Quebec
Living people
People from Longueuil
Canadian women trade unionists
Trade unionists from Quebec
Black Canadian politicians
Black Canadian women
21st-century Canadian politicians
21st-century Canadian women politicians
Year of birth missing (living people)
Canadian nurses
Canadian women nurses